Cartosat-2E is an Earth observation satellite developed by the Indian Space Research Organisation (ISRO), and is the seventh in the Cartosat series. It is designed to collect high-resolution, large-scale imagery for use in urban planning, infrastructure development, utilities planning, and traffic management.

Instruments 
Cartosat-2E carries three primary instruments: the Panchromatic Camera (PAN), the High-Resolution Multi-Spectral radiometer (HRMX), and the Event Monitoring camera (EvM).

 Event Monitoring camera (EvM) is also capable of capturing minute long video of a fixed spot as well, Event Monitoring camera (EvM) for frequent high-resolution land observation of selected areas.

Launch 
The satellite was launched on 23 June 2017, along with NIUSAT and 29 other satellites, aboard a PSLV-XL, PSLV-C38 launch vehicle from the Satish Dhawan Space Centre First Launch Pad. India has allocated  (US$25 million in 2017) for the project.

See also 

 List of Indian satellites

References 

Cartosat
Spacecraft launched by India in 2017
Spacecraft launched by PSLV rockets